The Chemin de fer du Cambrésis was a  long metre gauge railway in the Nord and Aisne departments of France. There were four lines with Caudry at the centre.

History

The Cambrésis railway opened in 1881. It was a voies ferrées d'intérêt local system. From Caudry, lines ran to Cambrai in the north, Denain in the east, Catillon in the south, and St. Quentin Cambrésis in the west.

The  line from Caudry to Denain opened in 1891.

Wars

World War One
The Germans destroyed the CF du Cambrésis' infrastructure when they retreated in 1918. The lines were rebuilt, with Caudry - Villers-Outréaux reopening in 1921 and Villers-Outréaux - Saint-Quentin-Cambrésis reopening in 1923. St. Quentin Cambrésis - St. Jean reopened to freight only in 1923. The line west of St. Jean did not reopen after the war.

World War Two

In 1943, the CF du Cambrésis received three Corpet-Louvet 2-8-2T locomotives that had been destined for the Chemin de Fer Conakry-Niger in French Guinea. These locomotives were numbered 40, 41 and 42 in the CF du Cambrésis fleet. They were returned in 1947, and subsequently delivered to their intended customer.

Closure

Closure occurred in stages. The line between Cambrai and Awoingt closed in 1936. Passenger service ceased between Le Catelet-Gouy and St. Quentin in 1936. Le Catelet-Gouy to St. Quentin Cambrésis closed in 1954, and the entire system except Caudry - Denain closed in 1955. Final closure occurred in 1960.

Freight
The main freight was coal from Denain. Agricultural produce and general merchandise was also carried.

Locomotives

 Three Corpet-Louvet locomotives built in 1881. Cambrai Scrapped in 1936.
 No. 5 Clary Corpet-Louvet 493/1888 0-6-0T. Sold to the Loddington Tramway in the UK, then to the Waltham Iron Ore Tramway. In 2017, preserved at the Irchester Narrow Gauge Railway Museum with nameplates from  Cambrai.
 Corpet 2-6-0T locomotives built in 1917, ex tramways de la Côte d'Or
Pinguely 2-6-0T locomotives built in 1904, ex tramways de la Côte d'Or.
Piguet 2-6-0T locomotives built in 1914, ex tramways de la Côte d'Or.
3 Corpet-Louvet 2-8-2T locomotives, on loan 1944-47. (#40, 41 and 42)
3 Corpet-Louvet 2-8-2T locomotives, built 1948. (1924/1948 #40, 1925/1948 #41 (scrapped 1958) and 1926/1948 #42).

Railcars
The CF du Cambrésis had some four-wheeled Renault-Scémia railcars. These were only used on the lightest of trains.

Gallery

References

History of Nord (French department)
Aisne
Metre gauge railways in France
Railway companies of France
Railway lines in Hauts-de-France
Railway lines opened in 1881
Railway lines closed in 1960